The Unscrupulous Ones is a 1962 Brazilian crime film directed by Ruy Guerra. It was entered into the 12th Berlin International Film Festival.

Cast
 Jece Valadão - Jandir
 Norma Bengell - Leda
 Daniel Filho - Vavá
 Hugo Carvana
 Lucy de Carvalho - Vilma
 Germana de Lamare
 Marina Ferraz
 Glauce Rocha
 Aline Silva
 Fátima Somer

References

External links

1962 crime films
1962 films
1962 directorial debut films
1960s Portuguese-language films
Brazilian black-and-white films
Brazilian crime films
Films directed by Ruy Guerra